Norbert Dürpisch (born 29 May 1952) is an East German former cyclist. He competed in the team pursuit event at the 1976 Summer Olympics.

References

External links
 

1952 births
Living people
East German male cyclists
Olympic cyclists of East Germany
Cyclists at the 1976 Summer Olympics
People from Genthin
Cyclists from Saxony-Anhalt
People from Bezirk Magdeburg